Christopher Philip Unwin (27 September 1917; 21 December 2004) was the Archdeacon of Northumberland from 1963 to 1982.

Unwin was educated at Repton School; Magdalene College, Cambridge; and Queen's Theological College, Birmingham. He was ordained deacon in 1940, and priest in 1941. He served curacies in Benwell and Sugley; and incumbencies in Horton and Benwell.

References

1917 births
People educated at Repton School
Alumni of Magdalene College, Cambridge
Alumni of the Queen's Foundation
Archdeacons of Northumberland
20th-century English Anglican priests
2004 deaths